Dallas Woodhouse (born May 10, 1973) is an American political operative active in North Carolina and South Carolina. 
In May 2022, Woodhouse was named the executive director of the South Carolina Policy Council, a limited-government think tank based in Columbia South Carolina.

From 2019 to 2022, Woodhouse worked for North Carolina think tanks: the John Locke Foundation and the Civitas Institute.

Woodhouse was the investigative political analyst for Carolina Journal From January 2021 until April 28, 2022.  Woodhouse joined the John Locke Foundation when the organization merged with the John William Pope Civitas Institute, a sister free market limited government organization. 

From 2019-2020, Woodhouse served as the director of strategic initiatives for the Civitas Institute, a Raleigh-based non-profit policy organization. 

While mostly focusing currently on South Carolina politics Woodhouse continues to write a weekly column on North Carolina politics for the John Locke Foundation, called "The Woodshed."

Founded in 1986, the South Carolina Policy Council (SCPC) is dedicated to working closely with lawmakers and policy influencers to improve the lives of those in the Palmetto State through limited responsible government, free enterprise, and individual liberty and responsibility. Woodhouse has spent two decades examining and managing political and policy operations as a leader of four right-leaning non-profit organizations.
 
He was the executive director of the North Carolina Republican Party from October 2015 to June 2019.

Early life and education
Woodhouse was born in Raleigh, North Carolina. He received a Bachelor of Arts degree in mass communications from Campbell University in 1995 and a Master of Arts from North Carolina State University in 2005.

Woodhouse has a background in drama and performing arts.  At Broughton High School in Raleigh, Woodhouse was a member of a two-time national championship show choir named Carolina Sprit.  Woodhouse acted and performed in various professional stage productions at the North Carolina Theatre in downtown Raleigh. Woodhouse also worked backstage on many productions and was an instructor at the North Carolina Theatre's Summer Theatre Arts School.  Woodhouse later served six years on the NCT Board of Directors and served as an advocate of the organization.

Career

Broadcasting
Woodhouse started his career in broadcast journalism, working as a political reporter and television host. 

Woodhouse worked throughout his college career at WPTF 680-AM and WQDR-FM mostly running the stations in the overnight hours on the weekends. 

Woodhouse was a reporter and photographer at WKFT from November 1994 to May 1995. He then worked at WNCN-TV which was the NBC station (NBC-17) from June 1995 to November 2001, where he was a political reporter and host of the current affairs program At Issue. He was also an adjunct instructor at Campbell University from July 1999 to October 2001. He worked as a reporter with WLFL from March 2003 to September 2005.

While at NBC-17, Woodhouse hosted a popular weekly political and public affairs program "At-Issue."
He reported on North Carolina-based war efforts from Bosnia, Qatar and Turkey, as well as London regarding the death of Princess Diana.

Politics
Woodhouse has been involved in North Carolina politics for many years. He served a one-year appointment as communications and congressional director for USDA Rural Development from March 2002 to March 2003. He was a spokesperson and communications director for Virginia Johnson's Congressional bid from May 2004 to November 2004.

Beginning in 2006, Woodhouse worked for Americans for Prosperity as their communications and legislative director. He took a position as state director of the chapter in August 2007. He stepped down as state director in September 2013.

Woodhouse served on the North Carolina Institute of Constitutional Law Advisory Board from January 2008 to May 2011.

Woodhouse worked with Charlotte Mayor Pat McCrory to stop an expansion of taxpayer funding of political campaigns in 2010. The two also traveled together on the “Hands off our Health Care Tour” in leading the opposition to the Patient Protection and Affordable Care Act in North Carolina.

From September 2013 to January 2014, Woodhouse was campaign manager for Phil Berger Jr., who was running for U.S. Representative for North Carolina's 6th congressional district.

Woodhouse as Executive Director of the NCGGOP recruited Phil Berger Jr. to run for the State Court of Appeals, a seat which Mr. Berger won in 2016. Berger Jr. was elected to the State Supreme Court in 2020, and praised Woodhouse at his official swearing-in and when he took his oath of office. 

Woodhouse founded the 501(c)(4) conservative advocacy group Carolina Rising in February 2014. He is the former president of the organization, which has supported North Carolina Republicans and Governor Pat McCrory. Woodhouse is also the owner of Solutions NC, a limited liability company formed weeks before Carolina Rising was founded. During the 2014 midterm elections, Carolina Rising raised nearly $4.9 million and spent $4.7 million on political ads for Thom Tillis's Senate campaign.

Woodhouse and his brother Brad, who is active in Democratic politics, were featured in filmmaker Bryan Miller's 2014 documentary Woodhouse Divided. During a joint appearance with his brother on C-SPAN's Washington Journal promoting the film, Woodhouse's mother Joyce called in to the show to say she hoped the brothers would "have some of this out of your system when you come here for Christmas."

In April 2019, Woodhouse announced he was stepping down as the executive director of the North Carolina GOP.

North Carolina Republican Party
Woodhouse was selected as executive director of the North Carolina Republican Party in September 2015.

Personal life
Woodhouse is married with two children. He has two siblings, Joy and Brad.

References

External links
Carolina Rising

1970s births
Living people
Campbell University alumni
North Carolina Republicans
North Carolina State University alumni
Politicians from Raleigh, North Carolina